Đông Phú is a rural commune of Châu Thành District, Hậu Giang Province, in south-western Vietnam.

References

Populated places in Hậu Giang province
Communes of Hậu Giang province